Silicon tetrachloride or tetrachlorosilane is the inorganic compound with the formula SiCl4. It is a colourless volatile liquid that fumes in air. It is used to produce high purity silicon and silica for commercial applications. It's part of the chlorosilane family.

Preparation
Silicon tetrachloride is prepared by the chlorination of various silicon compounds such as ferrosilicon, silicon carbide, or mixtures of silicon dioxide and carbon. The ferrosilicon route is most common.

In the laboratory,  can be prepared by treating silicon with chlorine at :

It was first prepared by Jöns Jakob Berzelius in 1823.

Brine can be contaminated with silica when the production of chlorine is a byproduct of a metal refining process from metal chloride ore. In rare occurrences, the silicon dioxide in silica is converted to silicon tetrachloride when the contaminated brine is electrolyzed.

Reactions

Hydrolysis and related reactions
Like other chlorosilanes or silanes, silicon tetrachloride reacts readily with water:
SiCl4 + 2 H2O → SiO2 + 4 HCl
In contrast, carbon tetrachloride does not hydrolyze readily.  The reaction can be noticed on exposure of the liquid to air, the vapour produces fumes as it reacts with moisture to give a cloud-like aerosol of hydrochloric acid.

With alcohols and ethanol it reacts to give tetramethyl orthosilicate and tetraethyl orthosilicate:
SiCl4 + 4 ROH → Si(OR)4 + 4 HCl

Polysilicon chlorides
At higher temperatures homologues of silicon tetrachloride can be prepared by the reaction:
Si + 2 SiCl4 → Si3Cl8
In fact, the chlorination of silicon is accompanied by the formation of hexachlorodisilane Si2Cl6. A series of compounds containing up to six silicon atoms in the chain can be separated from the mixture using fractional distillation.

Reactions with other nucleophiles
Silicon tetrachloride is a classic electrophile in its reactivity. It forms a variety of organosilicon compounds upon treatment with Grignard reagents and organolithium compounds:
4 RLi + SiCl4 → R4Si + 4 LiCl
Reduction with hydride reagents afford silane.

Comparison with other SiX4 compounds

Uses
Silicon tetrachloride is used as an intermediate in the manufacture of polysilicon, a hyper pure form of silicon, since it has a boiling point convenient for purification by repeated fractional distillation. It is reduced to trichlorosilane (HSiCl3) by hydrogen gas in a hydrogenation reactor, and either directly used in the Siemens process or further reduced to silane (SiH4) and injected into a fluidized bed reactor. Silicon tetrachloride reappears in both these two processes as a by-product and is recycled in the hydrogenation reactor. Vapor phase epitaxy of reducing silicon tetrachloride with hydrogen at approximately 1250 °C was done:
 (g) + 2 (g) → Si(s) + 4 (g) at 1250°C

The produced polysilicon is used as wafers in large amounts by the photovoltaic industry for conventional solar cells made of crystalline silicon and also by the semiconductor industry.

Silicon tetrachloride can also be hydrolysed to fumed silica. High purity silicon tetrachloride is used in the manufacture of optical fibres. This grade should be free of hydrogen containing impurities like trichlorosilane. Optical fibres are made using processes like MCVD and OFD where silicon tetrachloride is oxidized to pure silica in the presence of oxygen.

As a feedstock in production of fused silica.

Safety and environmental issues
Pollution from the production of silicon tetrachloride has been reported in China associated with the increased demand for photovoltaic cells that has been stimulated by subsidy programs.   The MSDS notes that one should "avoid all contact! In all cases consult a doctor! ...  inhalation causes sore throat and Burning sensation".

See also
Silicon tetrachloride (data page)

References

Chlorides
Nonmetal halides
Inorganic silicon compounds
Chlorosilanes